Stara Piła is a PKP railway station in Stara Piła (Pomeranian Voivodeship), Poland.

Lines crossing the station

References 
Stara Piła article at Polish stations database, URL accessed at 17 March 2006

Railway stations in Poland opened in 1886
Railway stations in Pomeranian Voivodeship
Kartuzy County